The 1983 Alabama Crimson Tide baseball team represented the University of Alabama in the 1983 NCAA Division I baseball season. The Crimson Tide played their home games at Sewell–Thomas Stadium, and were led by fourth-year head coach Barry Shollenberger. They finished as the national runner-up after falling to Texas in the 1983 College World Series Final.

Roster

Schedule 

! style="" | Regular season
|- valign="top" 

|- align="center" bgcolor="ccffcc"
| February 24 ||  || Sewell–Thomas Stadium || 10–6 || 1–0||–
|- align="center" bgcolor="ccffcc"
| February 25 || at Alabama Christian || Unknown || 4–11 || 2–0 ||–
|- align="center" bgcolor="ccffcc"
| February 26 || at  || Eddie Stanky Field || 8–2 || 3–0 ||–
|- align="center" bgcolor="ccffcc"
| February 26 || at  || Sewell–Thomas Stadium || 18–7 || 4–0 ||–
|-

|- align="center" bgcolor="ccffcc"
| March 2 || Southern Mississippi || Sewell–Thomas Stadium || 14–1 || 5–0 || –
|- align="center" bgcolor="ffcccc"
| March 6 || at  || Dudy Noble Field || 6–18 || 5–1 || 0–1
|- align="center" bgcolor="ffcccc"
| March 6 || at Mississippi State || Dudy Noble Field || 5–6 || 5–2 || 0–2
|- align="center" bgcolor="ccffcc"
| March 8 || at  || Beautiful Tiger Field || 6–5 || 6–2 || 0–2
|- align="center" bgcolor="ccffcc"
| March 9 || at Clemson || Beautiful Tiger Field || 7–4 || 7–2 || 0–2
|- align="center" bgcolor="ccffcc"
| March 12 || South Alabama || Sewell–Thomas Stadium || 16–5 || 8–2 || 0–2
|- align="center" bgcolor="ccffcc"
| March 13 || South Alabama || Sewell–Thomas Stadium || 8–6 || 9–2 || 0–2
|- align="center" bgcolor="ccffcc"
| March 15 ||  || Sewell–Thomas Stadium || 12–7 || 10–2 || 0–2
|- align="center" bgcolor="ccffcc"
| March 19 ||  || Sewell–Thomas Stadium || 4–1 || 11–2 || 1–2
|- align="center" bgcolor="ccffcc"
| March 19 || LSU || Sewell–Thomas Stadium || 17–7 || 12–2 || 2–2
|- align="center" bgcolor="ccffcc"
| March 22 ||  || Sewell–Thomas Stadium || 14–1 || 13–2 || 2–2
|- align="center" bgcolor="ccffcc"
| March 23 || Georgia Southern || Sewell–Thomas Stadium || 14–1 || 14–2 || 2–2
|- align="center" bgcolor="ccffcc"
| March 27 || at  || Swayze Field || 12–3 || 15–2 || 3–2
|- align="center" bgcolor="ccffcc"
| March 27 || at  Ole Miss || Swayze Field || 8–2 || 16–2 || 4–2
|- align="center" bgcolor="ffcccc"
| March 29 ||  || Sewell–Thomas Stadium || 3–9 || 16–3 || 4–2
|- align="center" bgcolor="ccffcc"
| March 30 || Delta State || Sewell–Thomas Stadium || 2–1 || 17–3 || 4–2
|- align="center" bgcolor="ccffcc"
| March 31 ||  || Rickwood Field || 12–3 || 18–3 || 4–2
|-

|- align="center" bgcolor="ccffcc"
|April 2 || Auburn || Sewell–Thomas Stadium || 6–5 || 19–3 || 5–2
|- align="center" bgcolor="ccffcc"
|April 3 || Auburn || Sewell–Thomas Stadium || 3–2 || 20–3 || 6–2
|- align="center" bgcolor="ffcccc"
|April 3 || Auburn || Sewell–Thomas Stadium || 6–7 || 20–4 || 6–3
|- align="center" bgcolor="ffcccc"
|April 9  || Mississippi State || Sewell–Thomas Stadium || 10–13 || 20–5 || 6–4
|- align="center" bgcolor="ffcccc"
|April 9  || Mississippi State || Sewell–Thomas Stadium || 10–12 || 20–6 || 6–5
|- align="center" bgcolor="ccffcc"
|April 10 || Mississippi State || Sewell–Thomas Stadium || 12–9 || 21–6 || 7–5
|- align="center" bgcolor="ccffcc"
|April 12 ||  || Sewell–Thomas Stadium || 10–4 || 22–6 || 7–5
|- align="center" bgcolor="ccffcc"
|April 13 ||  || Sewell–Thomas Stadium || 15–4 || 23–6 || 7–5
|- align="center" bgcolor="ccffcc"
|April 16 || Alabama Christian || Sewell–Thomas Stadium || 6–5 || 24–6 || 7–5
|- align="center" bgcolor="ccffcc"
|April 17 ||  || Sewell–Thomas Stadium || 8–6 || 25–6 || 7–5
|- align="center" bgcolor="ffccc"
|April 19 || at Memphis State || Nat Buring Stadium || 2–5 || 25–7 || 7–5
|- align="center" bgcolor="ccffcc"
|April 20 || at Memphis State || Nat Buring Stadium || 3–2 || 26–7 || 7–5
|- align="center" bgcolor="ffcccc"
|April 23  || at LSU || Alex Box Stadium || 7–8 || 26–8 || 7–6
|- align="center" bgcolor="ccffcc"
|April 23 || at LSU || Alex Box Stadium || 10–3 || 27–8 || 8–6
|- align="center" bgcolor="ccffcc"
|April 24 || at LSU || Alex Box Stadium || 10–5 || 28–8 || 8–6
|- align="center" bgcolor="ccffcc"
|April 26 || at Southern Mississippi || Unknown || 17–1 || 29–8 || 9–6
|- align="center" bgcolor="ccffcc"
|April 27 || at Southern Mississippi || Unknown || 9–3 || 30–8 || 9–6
|- align="center" bgcolor="ffcccc"
|April 30 || Ole Miss || Sewell–Thomas Stadium || 3–4 || 30–9 || 9–7
|- align="center" bgcolor="ccffcc"
|April 30 || Ole Miss || Sewell–Thomas Stadium || 5–4 || 31–9 || 10–7
|-

|- align="center" bgcolor="#ccffcc"
| May 1 || Ole Miss || Sewell–Thomas Stadium || 17–10 || 32–9 || 11–7
|- align="center" bgcolor="#ccffcc"
| May 2 ||  || Sewell–Thomas Stadium || 18–12 || 33–9 || 11–7
|- align="center" bgcolor="#ccffcc"
| May 4 || Columbus || Sewell–Thomas Stadium || 15–9 || 34–9 || 11–7
|- align="center" bgcolor="#ccffcc"
| May 7 || at Auburn || Plainsman Park || 9–1 || 35–9 || 12–7
|- align="center" bgcolor="#ccffcc"
| May 7 || at Auburn || Plainsman Park || 6–4 || 36–9 || 13–7
|- align="center" bgcolor="#ccffcc"
| May 8 || at Auburn || Plainsman Park || 13–5 || 37–9 || 14–7
|-

|-
! style="" | Postseason
|- valign="top"

|- align="center" bgcolor="#ccffcc"
| May 13 || vs  || Dudy Noble Field || 15–2 || 38–9 || 14–7
|- align="center" bgcolor="#ccffcc"
| May 14 || vs  || Dudy Noble Field || 8–6 || 39–9 || 14–7
|- align="center" bgcolor="#ccffcc"
| May 15 || at Mississippi State || Dudy Noble Field || 10–9 || 40–9 || 14–7
|-

|- align="center" bgcolor="#ccffcc"
| May 27 || vs  || Seminole Stadium || 6–4 || 41–9 || 14–7
|- align="center" bgcolor="#ccffcc"
| May 28 || at  || Seminole Stadium || 7–5 || 42–9 || 14–7
|- align="center" bgcolor="#ccffcc"
| May 29 || vs Miami (FL) || Seminole Stadium || 11–9 || 43–9 || 14–7
|-

|- align="center" bgcolor="#ccffcc"
| June 4 || vs Arizona State || Johnny Rosenblatt Stadium || 6–5 || 44–9 || 14–7
|- align="center" bgcolor="#ccffcc"
| June 7 || vs Michigan || Johnny Rosenblatt Stadium || 6–5 || 45–9 || 14–7
|- align="center" bgcolor="#ffcccc"
| June 9 || vs Texas || Johnny Rosenblatt Stadium || 4–6 || 45–10 || 14–7
|- align="center" bgcolor="#ccffcc"
| June 10 || vs Arizona State || Johnny Rosenblatt Stadium || 6–0 || 46–10 || 14–7
|- align="center" bgcolor="#ffcccc"
| June 11 || vs Texas || Johnny Rosenblatt Stadium || 3–4 || 46–11 || 14–7
|-

Awards and honors 
Dave Magadan
 College World Series All-Tournament Team
 Golden Spikes Award

Tim Meacham
 College World Series All-Tournament Team

Crimson Tide in the 1983 MLB Draft 
The following members of the Alabama Crimson Tide baseball program were drafted in the 1983 Major League Baseball Draft.

References 

Alabama
Alabama Crimson Tide baseball seasons
Alabama Crimson Tide baseball
College World Series seasons